Eustace Clarence Mullins Jr. (March 9, 1923 – February 2, 2010) was an American white supremacist, antisemitic conspiracy theorist, propagandist, Holocaust denier, and writer. A disciple of the poet Ezra Pound, his best-known work is The Secrets of The Federal Reserve, in which he alleged that several high-profile bankers had conspired to write the Federal Reserve Act for their own nefarious purposes, and then induced Congress to enact it into law. The Southern Poverty Law Center described him as "a one-man organization of hate".

Life

Eustace Clarence Mullins, Jr. was born in Roanoke, Virginia, the third child of Eustace Clarence Mullins (1899–1961) and his wife Jane Katherine Muse (1897–1971). His father was a salesman in a retail clothing store. He said he was educated at Ohio State University, New York University, and the University of North Dakota, although the FBI was unable to verify his attendance at any of them, with the exception of one summer session at NYU in 1947.

In December 1942 he enlisted in the military as a Warrant Officer at Charlottesville, Virginia. He was a veteran of the United States Army Air Forces, serving thirty-eight months during World War II.

In 1949 Mullins worked at the Institute for Contemporary Arts in Washington, D.C. where he met Ezra Pound's wife Dorothy, who introduced him to her husband. Pound was at the time incarcerated in St. Elizabeth's Hospital for the Mentally Ill. Mullins visited the poet frequently, and for a time acted as his secretary. Later, he wrote a biography, This Difficult Individual Ezra Pound (1961), which literary critic Ira Nadel describes as "prejudiced and often melodramatic". According to Mullins it was Pound who set him on the course of research that led to his writing The Secrets of The Federal Reserve.

Mullins became a researcher at the Library of Congress in 1950 and helped Senator Joseph McCarthy in making claims about Communist Party funding sources. He later stated that he believed McCarthy had "started to turn the tide against world communism". Shortly after his first book, The Secrets of The Federal Reserve, came out in 1952, he was discharged by the Library of Congress.

From April 1953 until April 1954, Mullins was employed by the American Petroleum Industries Committee (APIC).  He was cited in 1954 as a "neo-Fascist" by the House Un-American Activities Committee, which noted in particular his article "Adolph Hitler: An Appreciation", written in 1952, in which he compared Hitler to Jesus and described both as victims of Jews.  In 1956 he sued the APIC for breach of contract, charging that the group had hired him as a sub rosa propagandist to undermine Zionism, but failed to live up to a verbal agreement to pay him $25,000 for his covert services.  The APIC responded that Mullins had been hired “as one of several economist-writers in a subordinate capacity", and denied that he had been employed “in any capacity at any time for the purpose he [alleged].″  The lawsuit, like many others filed by Mullins over the years, was eventually dismissed.

In the 1950s, Mullins began his career as an author writing for Conde McGinley’s antisemitic newspaper Common Sense, which promoted the second edition of his book on the Federal Reserve, entitled The Federal Reserve Conspiracy (1954). Around this time, he also wrote for Lyrl Clark Van Hyning's Chicago-based newsletter, Women's Voice. He was a member of the National Renaissance Party and wrote for its journal, The National Renaissance.  In the 1990s and 2000s, he wrote for Criminal Politics. Mullins was on the editorial staff of the American Free Press and became a contributing editor to the Barnes Review, both published by Willis Carto's Liberty Lobby.

Mullins lived in Staunton, Virginia, in the house at 126 Madison Place where he grew up, from the mid 1970s through the end of his life.

Writings

The Secrets of the Federal Reserve
In the late 1940s, when the poet Ezra Pound was incarcerated in St. Elizabeths Hospital on treason charges against the US, he corresponded with Mullins. In their correspondence, Mullins exclaimed "THE JEWS ARE BETRAYING US", in a letter written on Aryan League of America stationery. The two became friends and Mullins often visited the poet while he was detained. In his "Foreword" to The Secrets of the Federal Reserve, Mullins explains the circumstances by which he came to write his investigation into the origins of the Federal Reserve System: "In 1949, while I was visiting Ezra Pound… [he] asked me if I had ever heard of the Federal Reserve System. I replied that I had not, as of the age of 25. He then showed me a ten dollar bill marked "Federal Reserve Note" and asked me if I would do some research at the Library of Congress on the Federal Reserve System which had issued this bill."

Mullins told Pound that he had little interest in such a research project because he was working on a novel. "My initial research" wrote Mullins, "revealed evidence of an international banking group which had secretly planned the writing of the Federal Reserve Act and Congress’ enactment of the plan into law. These findings confirmed what Pound had long suspected. He said, 'You must work on it as a detective story.'"

Mullins completed the manuscript during the course of 1950 when he began to seek a publisher. Eighteen publishers turned the book down without comment before the President of the Devin-Adair Publishing Company, Devin Garrity, told him, "I like your book but we can't print it ... Neither can anybody else in New York. You may as well forget about getting [it] published."

In 1952, the book was finally published by two of Pound's other disciples, John Kasper and David Horton, under the title Mullins on the Federal Reserve.  In it, Mullins postulated a conspiracy among Paul Warburg, Edward Mandell House, Woodrow Wilson, J.P. Morgan, Benjamin Strong, Otto Kahn, the Rockefeller family, the Rothschild family, and other European and American bankers that led to the founding of the U.S. Federal Reserve System. He argued that the Federal Reserve Act of 1913 defies Article 1, Section 8, Paragraph 5 of the United States Constitution by creating a "central bank of issue" for the United States. Mullins went on to claim that World War I, the Agricultural Depression of 1920, and the Great Depression of 1929 were brought about by international banking interests to profit from conflict and economic instability. Mullins also cited Thomas Jefferson's staunch opposition to the establishment of a central bank in the United States.

In an updated edition published in 1983 and retitled Secrets of the Federal Reserve, Mullins argued that Kuhn, Loeb & Co. and the House of Morgan were fronts for the Rothschilds. He asserted that financial interests connected to the J. Henry Schroder Company and the Dulles brothers financed Adolf Hitler (in contrast to Pound's declaration that Hitler was a sovereign who disdained international finance.
). He called the Rothschilds "world monopolists", and claimed that City of London bankers owned the Federal Reserve, since they owned much of the stock of its member banks. He attempted to trace stock ownership, as it changed hands via mergers and acquisitions, from the inception of the Federal Reserve in 1913 to the early 1980s.

In the last chapter of the book, he noted various Congressional investigations, and criticized the immense degree of power possessed by these few banks who owned majority shares in the Federal Reserve. He also criticized the Bilderberg Group, attacking it as an international consortium produced by the Rockefeller-Rothschild alliance. In an appendix to the book, he delved further into the City of London, and criticized the Tavistock Institute of Human Relations, which he claimed helps to conduct psychological warfare on the citizens of Britain and the United States.

Mullins dedicated Secrets of the Federal Reserve to George Stimpson and Ezra Pound.  It became his best known book, and remains broadly influential in American far-right movements.  A copy was reportedly found in Osama bin Laden's library at his compound in Abbottabad, along with Bloodlines of the Illuminati by Fritz Springmeier, another right-wing conspiracy theorist.

Hitler and the Holocaust
Mullins' October 1952 article entitled "Adolf Hitler: An Appreciation" was mentioned in a report by the House Un-American Activities Committee. In it, he espoused antisemitic views and expressed the belief that America owed a debt to Hitler.  The article first appeared in The National Renaissance, journal of the National Renaissance Party.

In a tract from 1984 called The Secret Holocaust, Mullins stated that the accepted account of the Holocaust is implausible, calling it a cover story for Jewish-led Soviet massacres of Christians and anti-communists.  In particular, Mullins argues that by the mid-1960s, in order to divert the world's attention away from this putative mass slaughter, "the Jews" had cooked up the story of the Holocaust, using "photographs of the bodies of their German victims, which are exhibited today in gruesome 'museums' in Germany as exhibits of dead Jews" as evidence for their claims.

The Biological Jew
In 1968, Mullins authored the tract The Biological Jew, which he claimed was an objective analysis of the forces behind the "decline" of Western Culture. He claimed that the main influence that people were overlooking in their analysis of world affairs was "parasitism".

The World Order
Michael Barkun describes Mullins' 1992 work The World Order: Our Secret Rulers as "a more openly anti-Semitic version of the Illuminati theory". He writes:

Political activities
Mullins was involved with a number of extremist right-wing and neofascist groups from the early 1950s through the 1990s.  These included the National Association for the Advancement of White People and James H. Madole's organization, the National Renaissance Party (NRP).  In the early 1950s Mullins regularly spoke in public at NRP demonstrations.  His then-roommate was Matt Koehl, later the leader of the American Nazi Party but at that time head of the NRP's "Security Echelon Guard."

In the late 1950s Mullins also collaborated with "scientific racist" Robert Kuttner, an associate editor of Charles Lee Smith's magazine, The Truth Seeker, in theorizing Kuttner's ideas on white supremacy.  They cofounded the Institute for Biopolitics in 1958 in order to popularize Kuttner's theories and their precursors in the work of Morley Roberts.

By the mid-1990s Mullins was "considered a national leader" in the constitutional militia movement.  He spoke regularly to militia groups across the United States during this time.  The Secrets of the Federal Reserve provided, in part, the theoretical underpinning of the movement's conspiracy theories about a secretive cabal of wealthy families controlling the international monetary system.

Death
While on a speaking tour in Columbus, Ohio in January 2010, Mullins suffered a stroke. He died on February 2, 2010, aged 86, in Hockley, Texas.

Works

Books
 The Biological Jew. Staunton, Virg.: Faith and Service Books (1967)
 The Curse of Canaan: A Demonology of History. Staunton, Virg.: Revelation Books (1987). .
 The Federal Reserve Conspiracy. Union, NJ: Common Sense (1954).
 Mullins' New History of the Jews. Staunton, Virg. (1978).
 Reprint of 1968 edition. Quoting from the introduction: "... throughout the history of civilization, one particular problem of mankind has remained constant. In all of the vast records of peace and wars and rumors of wars, one great empire after another has had to come to grips with the same dilemma ... the Jews."
 Murder by Injection: The Medical Conspiracy Against America. Staunton, Virg.: National Council for Medical Research. .
 My Life in Christ. Staunton, Virg. (1968).
 The Rape of Justice: America's Tribunals Exposed. Staunton, Virg.: (1989).
 The Secret History of the Atomic Bomb. (Jun. 1998)
 The Secrets of the Federal Reserve: The London Connection. Staunton, Virg.: Bankers Research Institute (1952).
 Reprinted: John McLaughlin (1983), 208 pages. .
 The Sedition Case. Metairie, LA: Sons of Liberty (1985).
 This Difficult Individual: Ezra Pound. New York: Fleet Publishing Corporation; Hollywood, Calif.: Angriff Press (1961). .
 Reprinted: Noontide Press. .
 War! War! War! (3rd Rev.). Metairie, Calif.: Sons of Liberty (1984). . Afterword by William Anderson.
 Who Owns the TV Networks? (1995).
 A Writ for Martyrs (1985). .
  
The World Order: A Study in the Hegemony of Parasitism. Staunton, Virg.: (1985).
The World Order: Our Secret Rulers. Staunton, Virg.: (1992)

See also
A Racial Program for the Twentieth Century

References

External links

FBI files via Archive.org
Part 1 | Part 2 | Part 3 | Part 4 | NYC | Richmond
The World Order at Internet Archive
Eustace Mullins papers, 1966-1968. .
Audio (mp3) archive.
The Magical Money Machine [video] (48 min). Interview with Mullins on the Federal Reserve.
 HUAC report on Neo-Fascist groups, including material on Mullins.
Tribute site with his complete works

1923 births
2010 deaths
American conspiracy theorists
American neo-Nazis
American pamphleteers
American male non-fiction writers
American people of Swiss-German descent
Blood libel
People from Hockley, Texas
People from Staunton, Virginia
Military personnel from Virginia
University of North Dakota alumni
Washington and Lee University alumni
White separatists
Writers from Roanoke, Virginia
Writers from Texas